Trevone (meaning river farm) is a seaside village and bay (meaning Musun cove) near Padstow in Cornwall, England, UK.

Geography
Trevone Bay is a Site of Special Scientific Interest (SSSI). It contains four Geological Conservation Review sites (GCR) and is within the Cornwall Area of Outstanding Natural Beauty (AONB). There are Goniatite fossils on Pentonwarra Point and Conodont fossils on Marble Cliff. The 'Sink Hole', a large blowhole formed by a collapsed sea cave, can be seen on a sloping field above the east side of the bay.

Porthmissen Beach received the highest rating for water quality in 2008 and a good rating in 2002. No dogs are allowed on the beach during the summer months.

Facilities
The village has a village hall, a shop, a Surfing shop and small seasonal cafe. There is also a general store halfway between the top of the hill and the beach. Trevone has recently had its post office closed down, and the general store where the PO operated from is also now closed. However, there is a new store based at Trevone Farm. 

Trevone used to have many hotels including Green Waves, Newlands, Trevone Bay Hotel, and The Sea Spray, but the only remaining hotel (and pub) in the bay is the Well Parc.The Newlands Hotel (bed and breakfast) has been renamed Trevone Beach House, and is currently being developed into a private family house. The other hotels are now tourist apartments.

St Saviour's Church

St Saviour's Church was built in 1959 with local sandstone from St Columb Downs, replacing a wooden mission church built in 1894. The stone is iron-rich which works outwards as the stone is weathered to give a hard casing. The roof is of Delabole slate. It is dedicated to St Saviour because there was a St Saviour's Chapel on what is now St Saviour's Point, on the Camel Estuary outside Padstow, inside the Doom Bar.

Elizabeth Maria Molteno, the South African suffragist, poet and civil rights activist, retired to Trevone and is buried at St Saviour's.

See also

 Harlyn
 Constantine Bay
 Treyarnon
 Porthcothan
 St. Merryn

References

Beaches of Cornwall
Villages in Cornwall
Blowholes
Padstow